is a private junior college in Dazaifu, Fukuoka, Japan, established in 1975. The present name of the school was adopted in 2008.

External links
 Official website 

Japanese junior colleges
Educational institutions established in 1975
Private universities and colleges in Japan
Universities and colleges in Fukuoka Prefecture
Early childhood education in Japan
Buildings and structures in Dazaifu, Fukuoka
Teachers colleges in Japan